Travis Peter Goethel (born July 27, 1987) is a former American football linebacker  He was drafted in the sixth round, (190th overall) of the 2010 NFL Draft. He played college football for Arizona State.

High school
Goethel attended Vista High School in Vista, California. As a junior, he recorded 155 tackles, including 14 tackles for loss, 8 quarterback sacks, and 5 interceptions, two which he returned for touchdowns. He was rated as high as the No.10 linebacker in the country by Rivals.com. He picked Arizona State over scholarship offers from Oregon State, Utah and Washington.

College career
He played in all 50 games over his four-year career at Arizona State, including 41 starts. He totaled 228 tackles (143 solo), 19.0 tackles for loss, 2.0 sacks, nine pass break-ups, three interceptions, three forced fumbles and one fumble recovery in his career. He was an Honorable Mention Pac-10 All selection in his senior season, and in his freshman season, garnered Pac-10 All freshman honors and honorable mention Freshman All-American.

Professional career
Goethel was drafted by the Oakland Raiders in the sixth round, (190th overall) of the 2010 NFL Draft.  In addition to his normally assigned position as linebacker, Goethel served as a backup long snapper.

During the 2012 season opener, regular long snapper Jon Condo suffered a concussion, forcing Goethel into duty. Out of his 4 snaps, 3 resulted in blocked punts against the San Diego Chargers. Oakland Raiders head coach Dennis Allen defended Goethel, who had not long snapped since high school, by stating he had not been prepared during full-team drills.

On July 23, 2013, Goethel was waived by the Oakland Raiders.

The Onion article
Shortly after he was drafted in 2010, Goethel was the subject of an article by satirical publication The Onion saying that the Raiders selected him to be a realtor. Ironically, Goethel's fictional "switch to realtor" was described as being "better than being asked to switch to […] long snapper," when Goethel would in fact gain infamy for his struggles as Oakland's long snapper in 2012.

References

External links

 Oakland Raiders bio
 Arizona State Sun Devils bio

1987 births
Living people
Sportspeople from Oceanside, California
People from Vista, California
American football linebackers
Arizona State Sun Devils football players
Arizona State University alumni
Oakland Raiders players
Players of American football from California
American real estate brokers
Ed Block Courage Award recipients